Hans Holt (22 November 1909 – 3 August 2001) was an Austrian film actor. He appeared in more than 100 films between 1935 and 1990.

Selected filmography

 Hannerl and Her Lovers (1936)
 Catherine the Last (1936)
 Florentine (1937)
 Roxy and the Wonderteam (1938)
 The Scoundrel (1939)
 Immortal Waltz (1939)
 A Mother's Love (1939)
 Roses in Tyrol (1940)
 Whom the Gods Love (1942)
 Black on White (1943)
 Dir zuliebe (1944)
 The Angel with the Trumpet (1948)
 Wedding with Erika (1950)
 When the Evening Bells Ring (1951)
 Queen of the Night (1951)
 Spring on Ice (1951)
 1. April 2000 (1952)
 My Wife Is Being Stupid (1952)
 The Mine Foreman (1952)
 Lavender (1953)
 The Emperor Waltz (1953)
 Love and Trumpets (1954)
 Let the Sun Shine Again (1955)
 Die Trapp-Familie (1956)
 The Trapp Family in America (1958)
 I'll Carry You in My Arms (1958)
 Almost Angels (1962) - Director Eisinger
 Stolen Heaven (1974)
 Goetz von Berlichingen of the Iron Hand (1979)
 Der Bockerer (1981)

Decorations and awards
 1963 Austrian Cross of Honour for Science and Art, 1st class
 1966 Josef Kainz Medal for the role of George in Who's Afraid of Virginia Woolf
 1987 German Film Award for his work in German films

References

External links
 

1909 births
2001 deaths
Austrian male film actors
Austrian male television actors
20th-century Austrian male actors
Male actors from Vienna
Recipients of the Austrian Cross of Honour for Science and Art, 1st class